Sun-Earth Day is a joint educational program established in 2000 by NASA and ESA. The goal of the program is to popularize the knowledge about the Sun, and the way it influences life on Earth, among students and the public. The day itself is mainly celebrated in the United States near the time of the spring equinox. However, the Sun-Earth Day event actually runs throughout the year, with a different theme being chosen each year.

Themes
The selection of each year's theme often corresponds to events for that year. Every theme is supported by free educational plans for both informal and formal educators. Here is a list of themes by year:

References

External links 

 Sun-Earth Day home page at NASA

Unofficial observances
March observances